The 2016 Angola Basketball Super Cup (23rd edition) was contested by Petro Atlético, as the 2015 league champion and Recreativo do Libolo, the 2015 cup winner. Petro Atlético won its 6th title.

The 2016 Women's Super Cup (21st edition) was contested by Primeiro de Agosto, as the 2015 women's league champion and Interclube, the 2015 cup runner-up. (Primeiro de Agosto won the cup as well). Interclube was the winner, making it is's 7th title.

2016 Men's Super Cup

2016 Women's Super Cup

See also
 2015 Angola Basketball Cup
 2015 BIC Basket
 2014 Victorino Cunha Cup

References

Angola Basketball Super Cup seasons
Super Cup